Denmark participated in the ninth Winter Paralympics in Turin, Italy. 

Denmark entered six athletes in the following sports:

Nordic skiing: 1 female
Wheelchair curling: 3 male, 2 female

Medalists

See also

2006 Winter Paralympics
Denmark at the 2006 Winter Olympics

External links
Torino 2006 Paralympic Games
International Paralympic Committee
Dansk Handicap Idræts-Forbund

2006
Nations at the 2006 Winter Paralympics
Winter Paralympics